The Mookie Blaylock 1991 United States Tour was a concert tour by the American rock band Pearl Jam when the band was still known as Mookie Blaylock. It was the band's first tour after having played its first few shows in late 1990.

History
The short tour of the United States focused on the West Coast. The majority of the shows found Pearl Jam serving as the opening act for Alice in Chains on the band's Facelift tour. Bassist Jeff Ament said, "We were then in the mode of 'Well, we’ve got to write a bunch of songs.' It wasn’t long after that we got a tour with Alice in Chains. It was kind of how we wanted it to be, we didn’t want to fuck around. I think Stone and I both knew the potential that he and I had together—but we needed to get out and play, and get better." Following the tour, the band soon signed to Epic Records. However, concerns about trademark issues with the name "Mookie Blaylock" necessitated a name change; the band's name became "Pearl Jam". This was Pearl Jam's only tour with original drummer Dave Krusen. Krusen left the band in May 1991 following the completion of the recording sessions for the band's debut album, Ten. Footage from the February 10, 1991 concert at The Bacchanal in San Diego, California can be found on Alice in Chains' Music Bank: The Videos DVD.

Tour dates
Information taken from various sources.

Band members
Jeff Ament – bass guitar
Stone Gossard – rhythm guitar
Mike McCready – lead guitar
Eddie Vedder – lead vocals
Dave Krusen – drums

Songs performed
Originals
"Alive"
"Alone"
"Breath"
"Brother"
"Deep"
"Even Flow"
"Garden"
"Once"
"Porch"
"Release"
"Wash"
"Why Go"

References

1991 concert tours
Pearl Jam concert tours